Barnoldby le Beck is a village and civil parish in North East Lincolnshire, England, It is situated just east of the A18 and is close to the village of Waltham and the town of Grimsby.

Etymology
The name Barnoldby le Beck has origins in the Norse settlement of North East Lincolnshire. The affix by means a farm or settlement and is preceded by the modern phrasing of the personal name Bjǫrnulfr. While le beck reflects the Scandinavian word bekkr which means stream.

History
In the Domesday Book, Barnoldby le Beck was a large village with 9 smallholders, 26 freeman, 12 ploughlands and a meadow of 200 acres. In 1066, the lord was Ralph the Staller, a constable of Edward the Confessor, and in 1086, the lord and tenant in chief was Alan Rufus.

Early land holders in the Middle Ages included the Abbot of Grimsby, John Yarborough and Geoffrey le Scrope.

Following the Enclosure of common lands in 1769 there were 12 landholders, including the Dashwood, Hewson and Bonsor families.

In 1820, the population of the village was 230, 232 in 1831, and in 1851 it was 269.

In 1855, the lord of the manor was B. Auningson and Miss Eleanor Tupling was the landlady of the Ship inn.

Church of St Helen's
The earliest surviving parts of the church date to the 13th century with later additions over the next 200 years. Renovations took place in 1839 and, by Ewan Christian, in 1892. In 1901–2, the porch and tower were rebuilt. A font bowl in the south aisle, dates to the 11th or 12th century.

Following the English Civil War, Anthony Harewood, the Royalist rector of the church of St. Helen's was replaced by a Puritan minister at the direction of the Earl of Manchester. The appointment of the new minister divided the village's inhabitants and some became early Quakers following a visit by a missionary for George Fox.

In 1855, the living of the rectory was in the gift of the Chapter of Southwell Collegiate church and worth £200. The incumbent at that time was Rev. H. M. Beecher. The village also had Primitive Methodist and Wesleyan chapels.

Community
The population of the parish in the 2011 Census was 346 residents.

The village public house is the Ship Inn, situated on Main Road.

Notable people
John Beecham Methodist writer
Andrew Osmond diplomat and co-founder of Private Eye was born here
Roland Bellamy, High Sheriff of Lincolnshire in 1971 lived here

Gallery

References

External links

 Church services at St. Helen's
 

Villages in Lincolnshire
Borough of North East Lincolnshire
Civil parishes in Lincolnshire